Flaujac-Gare is a commune in the Lot department in south-western France. It is a village with 96 residents in 2018, 300 miles south of Paris.

See also
Communes of the Lot department

References

Flaujacgare